Tirlok Malik (born in New Delhi) is an Indian-American film maker, actor and producer based in New York. He has been nominated in Emmy Awards. He is also an entrepreneur, ayurveda restaurateur and happy life yoga speaker.

Early life 
Malik was born and brought in New Delhi. He shifted to New York in his early 20s to expand his father's export business.

Biography 
Malik started his career as a model for print and television before shifting to theatre. He has more than 300 performance in the Broadway.

Later he became a producer and finally an actor, writer and director.

In 2007, He was nominated in Emmy Awards for producing the television series "Namaste: I love making films in New York".

He is CEO of Apple Productions and founder of Nritvfilmclub.

Malik has produced several films under the banner of Apple production since 1990 starting with Lonely in America. The film was shown in 74 countries and as well as on HBO and participated in 37 film festivals, winning multiple Awards. He continues to make films about Indian American experiences in America. He released a new short film 'To New India with Love' on the occasion of India's 75th Independence Day.

Malik's work as an actor and a filmmaker has been acclaimed globally. 
He also received the Pride of India Gold Medal for his work as a filmmaker from the Indian Ambassador of the USA. In August 2007, Tirlok Malik was presented with the New York Citizens Award from the New York Mayor's Office. In 2014, Manhattan Borough President Gale Brewer presented him a citation for his work as a filmmaker and a restaurateur and declared 1 November 2014 as Tirlok Malik appreciation day.

He has line produced (USA Filming) and Some of the films starring India Superstar Rajinikanth, Kamal Hassan, Suriya, Sanjay Dutt, Mamoothy, Sunny Deol, Kangana Ranut, Manisha Koirala, Mithun Chakravarty, Anupam kher.

As an actor, he has worked in many television series, and films. He has been in many advertisements including for Campbell Soup, Channel 7 Eyewitness News, PBS Channel 13, Microsoft, Air India, and Nokia.

Filmography

As an actor

As a producer and filmmaker

As a director

As a TV show producer

References 

Indian filmmakers
Indian male film actors
Living people
Year of birth missing (living people)